Trondheim Soloists are a musical chamber ensemble of string players based in Trondheim, Norway. The ensemble was founded in 1988 and has been an arena for professional concert training for string-players at the Music Conservatory at the Norwegian University of Science and Technology.

Recordings
Trondheim Soloist’s discography includes over twenty recordings. The Trondheim Soloists have recorded 6 CDs including Vivaldi’s ’'Four Seasons’' and all of the music for strings by Edvard Grieg. The French Diapason d’Or was awarded the orchestra for its recording of Grieg’s String Quartet No. 1 in G minor. Cellist Øyvind Gimse was appointed as artistic director in 2002.

Their performing style has been described as a hybrid between modern techniques and period ideas: they use baroque bows but on metal stringed instruments. The latest release, Divertimenti (2L, 2008), featuring pieces by Benjamin Britten and Béla Bartók, also marks the first ever audio-only release on Blu-ray technology. The record was later nominated for three Grammy awards.

Collaborations
Trondheim Soloists collaborates regularly with professional soloists such as Ben Caplan, Leif Ove Andsnes, Martin Fröst, Joshua Bell, Ole Edvard Antonsen, and Arve Tellefsen. Trondheim Soloists are perhaps mostly known for their extensive collaboration with German classical violinist Anne-Sophie Mutter. This collaboration has resulted in recordings of pieces by Vivaldi (Deutsche Grammophon, 1999) and Bach (Deutsche Grammophon, 2008). The Bach album made its debut on the Billboard "Top Classical Albums" chart in the No. 1 position in October 2008, and remained in the top five for five weeks. The collaboration with Mutter has also included touring. In November 2001, the Trondheim Soloists made their Carnegie Hall debut alongside Mutter

Selected discography
1999: Vivaldi: The Four Seasons (Deutsche Grammophon), with Anne-Sophie Mutter
2001: Trondheimsolistene (Universal Music)
2006: Mozart: Violin Concertos (2L), with Marianne Thorsen
2008: Gubaidulina In Tempus Praesens (Deutsche Grammophon), with Anne-Sophie Mutter
2008: Divertimenti  (2L)
2012: Infinite Gratitude (Kirkelig Kulturverksted), with Knut Reiersrud Band
2012: Souvenir - Part I & II (2L)
2014: Magnificat (2L), with Nidarosdomens Jentekor
2016: The Mechanical Fair (Olsen),  with Ola Kvernberg (re-release on LP)
2016: Reflections (2L)
2018: Transfigured Night (PENTATONE PTC 5186717), with Alisa Weilerstein

References

External links
Official website

Norwegian classical music groups
Chamber music groups
Musical groups established in 1988
1988 establishments in Norway
Musical groups from Trondheim